John E. Yunker (1896–1968) was a North Dakota public servant and politician with the Democratic-NPL Party. He served two terms in the North Dakota Senate (1955–62) representing the district encompassing Casselton in central Cass County.

Notes

1896 births
1968 deaths
Democratic Party North Dakota state senators
20th-century American politicians